Leptura quadrifasciata, the longhorn beetle, is a species of beetle in the family Cerambycidae. It was described by Carl Linnaeus in his landmark 1758 10th edition of Systema Naturae.

Adult beetles are 11–20 mm long, black with four more or less continuous transverse yellow bands. In extreme cases the elytra may be almost entirely black. It is found throughout the northern and central Palaearctic region.

Larvae make meandering galleries in various trees, including oak, beech, birch, willow, alder, elder and spruce. The life cycle lasts two or three years.

References

Lepturinae
Beetles described in 1758
Taxa named by Carl Linnaeus